The Riga Radio and TV Tower in Riga, Latvia is the tallest tower in the European Union. It was built between 1979 and 1989 with funding from the central government of the Soviet Union.

Features

There was a restaurant, "Vēja roze" ("Wind Rose"), at the  level, which was open since the completion of the tower until 2006.

Reconstruction
Since May 2019, the tower has closed to visitors for about five years for the renovation and expansion of the visitors' area and the adjacent territory under the TV Tower 2.0 project. It is planned to re-open in 2023 when there will again be a restaurant and the tower's bomb shelter will open to the public. A 500 kg Foucault pendulum will also be installed. The estimated costs are €40-50 million.

Construction
The design chosen for the tower was that of Georgian architect Kims Nikurdze. Also credited are Nikolajs Sergijevskis and Viktors Savčenko. Construction materials included dolomite from Saaremaa, Karelian granite, and ironwork that had been prefabricated in Chelyabinsk. The assembly was done by the St Petersburg North-western Ironwork Assembly Trust.

The tower is built to resist winds up to  without any noticeable vibration with the help of three  dampers installed at the  level. Though seismic activity is rare, the tower was designed to withstand a magnitude 7.5 earthquake. The projected service life of the tower is 250 years.

Bottom section
The support section of the tower rises the first , comprising the three pillars that give the tower its unusual appearance, and a central building that contains offices and machine rooms. There are two high-speed sloping elevators, one in the north-east pillar and one in the south-west pillar, that ascend the bottom section in just 42 seconds. The third pillar contains a staircase. It is one of only three "tall" towers in the world that has 3 pillars; the others are the Avala Tower in Belgrade and Žižkov Television Tower in Prague.

Middle section

Top section
An elevator rises to the machine rooms at the  level, and stairs ascend another .

Operations
The tower started broadcasting regularly in January 1986, though construction work continued until 1989.

The following television channels are broadcast from the tower:
Latvian Television 1
Latvian Television 7
TV3
RīgaTV 24
DVB-T signal (experimental)

The following radio stations broadcast from the tower:

There is a DAB+ test on channel 12D.

Additionally, broadcast and two-way communications services are provided for various organizations and government agencies.

See also 
 List of tallest towers in the world
 List of tallest freestanding structures in the world
 List of tallest freestanding steel structures
 Riga LVRTC Transmitter

Notes 
Sources vary slightly as to the exact height: The official website shows ; Emporis claims the exact equivalent, ; Structurae claims .

References

External links 

 Project "TV tornis 2.0" at the website of the Latvian State Radio and Television Center (in Latvian)
Former fficial homepage in Latvian, English, Russian, German
 

Towers completed in 1989
Towers built in the Soviet Union
Towers in Riga
Radio masts and towers in Europe
Observation towers
Restaurant towers
Telecommunications in Latvia